Scirpophaga marginepunctellus is a moth in the family Crambidae. It was described by Joseph de Joannis in 1927. It is found in Botswana, the Democratic Republic of the Congo (Katanga, West Kasai), Madagascar, Mozambique, Nigeria, Senegal and Sudan.

The wingspan is 25–30 mm for males and 36–44 mm for females. The forewings of the males are ochreous and the hindwings are white, the costal area suffused with pale fuscous. Females have white forewings, usually suffused with very pale ochreous white. The hindwings are white.

References

Moths described in 1927
Schoenobiinae
Moths of Sub-Saharan Africa
Moths of Madagascar